Otala is a genus of land snails in the subfamily Helicinae of the family  Helicidae. 

Archaeological evidence in Morocco indicates the exploitation of O. lactea by ancient Romans as a food source.

Distribution
This genus of snail is native to northwestern Africa and southwestern Europe.

Anatomy
These snails create and shoot love darts as part of their courtship and mating behavior.

Species
Species within the genus Otala include: 
 † Otala desoudiniana (Crosse, 1862) 
 Otala hieroglyphicula (Michaud, 1833)
 † Otala jobaeana (Crosse, 1861) 
  Otala juilleti (Terver, 1839)
 Otala lactea (Müller, 1774)
 Otala occulta D. Holyoak, G. Holyoak, Gómez Moliner & Chueca, 2020
 Otala orientalis (Pallary, 1918)
 Otala pallaryi (Kobelt, 1909)
 Otala punctata (Müller, 1774)
 Otala ramosi (Ahuir & Liñán, 2021)
 Otala tingitana (Paladilhe, 1875)
 Otala xanthodon (Anton, 1838)
Species brought into synonymy
 Otala (Otala) alicantensis Truc, 1971 †: synonym of Schlickumia alicantensis (Truc, 1971) †
 Otala (Otala) bottini (Sacco, 1884) †: synonym of Schlickumia bottinii (Sacco, 1884) † (incorrect subsequent spelling; new combination)
 Otala canariensis Mousson, 1872: synonym of  Otala lactea (Müller, 1774)
 Otala jacquemetana Mabille, 1883: synonym of Otala lactea (Müller, 1774)
 Otala vermiculata (O. F. Müller, 1774): synonym of Eobania vermiculata (O. F. Müller, 1774)

References

 Pfeffer, G. (1930). Zur Kenntnis tertiärer Landschnecken. Geologisch-Paläontologische Abhandlungen, neue Folge. 17(3): 153-380.
 Pallary, P. (1918). Diagnoses d'une cinquantaine de mollusques terrestres nouveaux du Nord de l'Afrique. Bulletin de la Société d'Histoire Naturelle d'Afrique du Nord, 9 (7): 137-152. Alger
 Holyoak, D.T. & Holyoak, G.A. (2017). A revision of the land-snail genera Otala and Eobania (Gastropoda, helicidae) in Morocco and Algeria. Journal of Conchology, 40 (6): 419-490. London

External links
 Schumacher C.F. (1817). Essai d'un nouveau système des habitations des vers testacés. Schultz, Copenghagen. iv + 288 pp., 22 pls
 Albers, J. C. (1850). Die Heliceen nach natürlicher Verwandtschaft systematisch geordnet. Berlin: Enslin. 262 pp.
 NCBI
 Pallary, P. (1919). Hélicidées nouvelles du Maroc. 2e Partie. Journal de Conchyliologie. 64 (2) [1918: 51-69, pl. 2-3. Paris]

Helicidae
Gastropod genera